Tarcenay-Foucherans is a commune in the Doubs department in the Bourgogne-Franche-Comté region in eastern France. It was established on 1 January 2019 by merger of the former communes of Tarcenay (the seat) and Foucherans.

See also
 Communes of the Doubs department

References

Communes of Doubs